Who Invented Divorce? (German: Wer das Scheiden hat erfunden) is a 1928 German silent film directed by Wolfgang Neff and starring Alfred Abel, Hans Albers and Caleb Glenn.

The film's sets were designed by Otto Erdmann and Hans Sohnle.

Cast
In alphabetical order
 Alfred Abel 
 Hans Albers 
 Charlotte Ander 
 Betty Astor 
 Eric Barclay 
 Eugen Burg 
 Piotr Zieliński
 Mary Parker
 Else Reval 
 Ernö Verebes

References

Bibliography
 Bock, Hans-Michael & Bergfelder, Tim. The Concise Cinegraph: Encyclopaedia of German Cinema. Berghahn Books, 2009.

External links

1928 films
Films of the Weimar Republic
German silent feature films
Films directed by Wolfgang Neff
German black-and-white films